North Hillsdale Methodist Church, also known as North Hillsdale United Methodist Church and Wesleyan Chapel of North Hillsdale, is a historic Methodist church located at North Hillsdale in Columbia County, New York. It was built between 1837 and 1838, and is a one-story, timber-frame building in the Greek Revival style. A steeple and monumental portico were added in 1859, and a mixed use addition was built on the rear in 1959.  The portico features four Doric order columns.

It was listed on the National Register of Historic Places in 2010.

References

External links
Church reference

Methodist churches in New York (state)
Properties of religious function on the National Register of Historic Places in New York (state)
Greek Revival church buildings in New York (state)
Churches completed in 1838
Churches in Columbia County, New York
National Register of Historic Places in Columbia County, New York